"Sexual Revolution" is a song by American singer Macy Gray from her second studio album, The Id (2001). It was released on November 26, 2001, as the album's second and final single.

In the United Kingdom, "Sexual Revolution" became Gray's first single to miss the top 40 since "Do Something" (1999), reaching number 45. The single had limited success in the United States as well, peaking at number four on the Hot Dance Club Play chart.

"Sexual Revolution" was released on two CD formats in the UK and contained remixes by Fatboy Slim and Miguel Migs. The single also contained Gray's version of the Christmas standard "Winter Wonderland".

Track listings
UK CD 1
"Sexual Revolution" (Radio Edit w/ Full Intro) – 4:02
"Sexual Revolution" (Miguel Migs Petalpusher Vocal) – 6:28
"Winter Wonderland" – 2:54
"Sexual Revolution" (music video)

UK CD 2
"Sexual Revolution" (Album Version) – 4:45
"Sexual Revolution" (Norman Cook Full Version 119bmp) – 6:28
"Sexual Revolution" (Blaze Shelter Vocal Mix) – 7:25

Australian CD single
"Sexual Revolution" (Album Version) – 4:45
"Sexual Revolution" (Morillo's Retro Club Mix) – 6:26
"Sexual Revolution" (Miguel Migs Petalpusher Vocal) – 6:39
"Sexual Revolution" (Norman Cook Radio Version @ 128bpm) – 3:33
"Sexual Revolution" (Blaze Shelter Early Dub) – 6:35

Charts

References

2001 singles
2001 songs
Disco songs
Epic Records singles
Funk songs
Macy Gray songs
Music videos directed by Jonathan Dayton and Valerie Faris
Songs written by Jeremy Ruzumna
Songs written by Macy Gray
Songs written by Darryl Swann